James Patrick Barber (July 21, 1912 – January 30, 1998) was an American football offensive tackle in the National Football League (NFL) for the Boston/Washington Redskins. He played college football at the University of San Francisco. Barber made the 1939 NFL All Pro team and was elected to the 1940 NFL Pro Bowl team.

Post NFL career
Barber joined the Navy in the World War II era and was stationed at Farragut Naval Training Station. Upon discharge, he became an assistant coach for the football team New York Yankees (AAFC) and Chicago Hornets under head coach Ray Flaherty. In 1949, he became an executive at Bill Hatch Sporting Goods in Spokane, Washington. In 1969, he entered the investment securities business and worked at G.C. George Securities, Inc., Pennaluna & Co., and L.L. Nicholls Co., which he bought and operated until his retirement in 1977.

References

External links

1912 births
1998 deaths
American football offensive tackles
San Francisco Dons football players
Boston Redskins players
Washington Redskins players
Players of American football from Nashville, Tennessee
United States Navy sailors
United States Navy personnel of World War II